Salyer may refer to:

People
Jamaree Salyer (born 2000), American football player
John Clark Salyer II (1902–1966), American environmentalist and government administrator
Karen Salyer McElmurray (born 1956), American author
Lucy E. Salyer, American historian and professor
Mona Salyer Lambird (1938–1999), American lawyer, first woman president of the Oklahoma Bar Association 
Philip Salyer (born 1981), American soccer player
Saunie Salyer,  American film critic
Stephen Salyer, American businessman

Places in the United States
Salyer, California, an unincorporated community
Salyer Lake, a reservoir in Caddo County, Oklahoma

See also
Salyer Ledge, a ridge in Victoria Land, Antarctica
Salyers, a list of people with the surname